Shahu District is a district (bakhsh) in Ravansar County, Kermanshah Province, Iran. At the 2006 census, its population was 8,119, in 1,774 families. The district has two rural districts (dehestan): Mansur-e Aqai Rural District and Quri Qaleh Rural District.

References 

Ravansar County
Districts of Kermanshah Province